|}

The Duke of York Stakes is a Group 2 flat horse race in Great Britain open to horses aged three years or older. It is run over a distance of 6 furlongs at York in May.

History
An event called the Duke of York Stakes was introduced at York's August meeting in 1895. It was named after Prince George, Duke of York (later King George V.) A middle-distance race for three-year-olds, its winners included Polymelus (1905), Papyrus (1923) and Firdaussi (1932).

A six-furlong handicap sprint titled the Duke of York Handicap Stakes was established at York's May meeting in 1950. It continued until the mid-1960s.

The current Duke of York Stakes, a six-furlong conditions race, was created in 1968. The first running was won by Hard Water. It was given Group 3 status in 1971, and promoted to Group 2 level in 2003.

The Duke of York Stakes is now held on the opening day of York's three-day Dante Festival meeting. It is run the day before the Dante Stakes.

The race is to be renamed to distance it from Prince Andrew, the current Duke of York who faces allegations of sexual abuse.

Records
Most successful horse (2 wins):
 Handsome Sailor – 1987, 1988

Leading jockey (4 wins):
 Lester Piggott – The Brianstan (1971), Steel Heart (1975), Thatching (1979), Vorvados (1983)
 Steve Cauthen – Flash n' Thunder (1980), Jester (1982), Indian Ridge (1989), Lugana Beach (1990)
 Michael Hills – Handsome Sailor (1988), Owington (1994), Royal Applause (1997), Steenberg (2006)

Leading trainer (7 wins):
 Barry Hills – Noble Mark (1974), Flash n' Thunder (1980), Jester (1982), Handsome Sailor (1987, 1988), Royal Applause (1997), Prime Defender (2010)

Leading owner (6 wins):
 Robert Sangster – Noble Mark (1974), Thatching (1979), Flash n' Thunder (1980), Jester (1982), Handsome Sailor (1987, 1988)

Winners

See also
 Horse racing in Great Britain
 List of British flat horse races

References

 Paris-Turf:
 Racing Post:

 galopp-sieger.de – Duke of York Stakes.
 ifhaonline.org – International Federation of Horseracing Authorities – Duke of York Stakes (2019).
 pedigreequery.com – Duke of York Stakes – York.
 

Open sprint category horse races
York Racecourse
Flat races in Great Britain
1968 establishments in England
Recurring sporting events established in 1968